Dawid Ogrodnik (born 28 May 1986, Wągrowiec) is a Polish actor. He has appeared in more than ten films since 2010.

Filmography

References

External links 

1986 births
Living people
Polish film actors
Polish male film actors
Polish male stage actors
Polish television actors
21st-century Polish male actors
People from Wągrowiec
Lielais Kristaps Award winners